The men's 4 × 100 metres relay event at the 1990 Commonwealth Games was held on 2 and 3 February at the Mount Smart Stadium in Auckland.

Medalists

* Athletes who competed in heats only and received medals.

Results

Heats
Qualification: First 4 teams of each heat (Q) plus the next 1 fastest (q) qualified for the final.

Final

References

Relay
1990